Elizabeth Hartwell Mason Neck National Wildlife Refuge is a National Wildlife Refuge of the United States located in Virginia. It is part of the Potomac River National Wildlife Refuge Complex. It is on Mason Neck, a peninsula in the Potomac River that forms part of the shoreline of Belmont Bay. The refuge is adjacent to Mason Neck State Park.

Established in 1969 and managed by the United States Fish and Wildlife Service, it was the first federal refuge created specifically for the protection of the bald eagle. It is covered with oak and hickory forest and it includes the largest freshwater marsh in northern Virginia.

Since its founding, the refuge has been renamed for Elizabeth S. Hartwell, a local activist who fought to keep Mason Neck free of development.

References
Refuge website

External links
 Nature soundscape of Mason Neck on an August night
 

National Wildlife Refuges in Virginia
Protected areas of Fairfax County, Virginia
Protected areas established in 1969
1969 establishments in Virginia
Wetlands of Virginia
Landforms of Fairfax County, Virginia